Shepherds Matriculation Higher Secondary School is located on the foothills of Yelagiri hills in Madapalli, Madavalam Post, Tirupattur taluk, Vellore district. The school was started in the year 1991 and celebrated its Silver Jubilee year in 2016. Shepherds Matriculation Higher Secondary School achieved yet another milestone on this same year by securing state second rank in 10th board exam by scoring 498 marks.

References

High schools and secondary schools in Tamil Nadu
Educational institutions established in 1991
1991 establishments in Tamil Nadu